A cargo hook is a device suspended below a helicopter and allows the transport of external loads during flight. Common terms for this operation include slingwork, underslung loads, external loadwork, and external load operations.

Hook types

Primary hooks 

Primary, or "belly", hooks are designed to mount directly to the airframe belly, i.e. underside, of a helicopter. Because they are attached to the fuselage, or "skin," of the aircraft, belly hooks are regulated by the various worldwide aviation regulatory agencies. In the United States, belly hooks are governed under Federal Aviation Administration (FAA) FAR Part 133. Belly hooks are designed, manufactured, and approved for use on specific aircraft models. Belly hooks that have been certified by the FAA receive a Supplemental Type Certificate (STC) that describes the aircraft models that are authorized to use the hook for external load operations. For example, a belly hook approved for use by the FAA on a Eurocopter AS350 could not be used on a Bell 407 helicopter unless covered by the STC.

For small to mid-size utility helicopters performing external load work, belly hooks are typically mounted to the fuselage using either a sling or a suspension configuration. The sling mount uses a single attachment point, whereas a suspension system uses four attachment points. Since suspension systems transfer the weight of the cargo load across a larger swath of the aircraft, they can carry heavier loads than sling mounts.

Remote hooks 

Remote hooks are suspended beneath the belly hook by a long line, swivel, or other device. Because they are not attached directly to the airframe, they do not require aircraft-specific certification and can be used on a wide variety of helicopter models.

Technical details

Parts of a cargo hook 
Key components of a cargo hook include the load beam, the keeper, and the attach point. The load beam is the solid piece of metal at the bottom of a cargo hook that supports the load. Usually it has a curved, narrow end which is used to load a ring, rope, or net onto the hook. The keeper is the locking, spring-operated mechanism that keeps the load from sliding off the load beam during transport. The attach point attaches the hook to the belly of the helicopter, swing system, or longline.

Helicopters and load capacities 
The following table includes a list of helicopter models that are designed to carry underslung loads. Cargo capacities provided reflect the airframe manufacturer's specifications; when put into practice the actual maximum load capacities may be less, depending on the rating of the cargo hook equipment. For example, if a helicopter model is rated by the manufacturer as having a maximum cargo sling load capacity of 4,000lb, but the cargo hook equipment is only rated for 3,000lb, then the pilot can only carry loads weighing 3,000lb or less.

Common usage 
Utility helicopter operators perform a wide variety of external load work that varies region to region and season to season. Some of the most common external load operations include:
Fire suppression with buckets;
Construction work
Fertilizer spreading
Heli-logging
Christmas tree harvesting
Electrical line work
Servicing oil rigs and stocking remote outposts with supplies
Agriculture (fence building, distributing hay bales, salt blocks, etc.)
Marijuana Extraction
Aerial Side-Trimming around power transmission lines and pipelines

See also 
 Military transport aircraft
 List of civil aviation authorities
 Aerial crane

References

External links 
 

Helicopter equipment